Eldar Rapaport is an American-Israeli film director, screenwriter and producer, best known for his 2011 feature film August.

Originally from Tel Aviv, he moved to the United States in 1991 to attend Emerson College and the New York University Film School. He won the Iris Prize in 2009 for his third short film Steam.

He is currently based in New York, where he works as Chief Creative Officer for the digital media production firm Screenz. He has also served on the jury for the Iris Prize several times since his own award win.

Films
Tremor (2003)
Postmortem (2005)
Steam (2009)
August (2011)
Little Man (2012)
The Last Survivor (2018)

References

External links

Israeli film directors
Israeli male screenwriters
Israeli film producers
Israeli television producers
Place of birth missing (living people)
Year of birth missing (living people)
Israeli LGBT screenwriters
LGBT film directors
LGBT television producers
Gay screenwriters
Film people from Tel Aviv
Living people
Emerson College alumni
New York University alumni
Gay Jews